The Monumentum Adulitanum was an ancient bilingual inscription in Ge'ez and Greek depicting the military campaigns of an Adulite king. The original text was inscribed on a throne in Adulis (Ge'ez:   መንበር manbar) written in Ge'ez in both the Ge'ez script and Sabean alphabet, while the Greek was written in the Greek alphabet. The monument was found in the port city state of Adulis (in modern-day Eritrea). Though the inscription and the monument have never been located by archaeologists, it is known about through the copying of the inscription by Cosmas Indicopleustes, a 6th-century Greek traveller-monk. 
The text describes the King's conquests in the Agame (a region in Tigray, Ethiopia) between 200 and 270 AD.

Text
The following translation is by Stuart Munro-Hay.
. . . and after I had commanded the peoples near my country to maintain the peace, I entered valiantly into battle and subdued the following peoples; I fought the Gaze, then the Agame and the Siguene, and, having conquered, I reserved for myself half of their lands and their peoples. The Aua and Singabene and Aggabe and Tiamaa and Athagaous and Kalaa and the Samene people who live beyond the Nile in inaccessible mountains covered with snow where tempests and cold are continuous and the snow so deep that a man sinks up to the knees, I reduced to submission after having crossed the river; then the Lasine, and Zaa and Gabala, who inhabit very steep mountains where hot springs rise and flow; and the Atalmo and the Beja and all the people who erect their tents with them. Having defeated the Taggaiton who dwell up to the frontiers of Egypt I had a road constructed going from the lands of my empire to Egypt.Then I fought the Annine and the Metine who live on precipitous mountains as well as the people of Sesea. They took refuge on an inaccessible peak, but I besieged them on all sides and captured them, and chose among them young men and women, boys and virgins. I retained also their goods.I defeated also the barbarian people of Rauso who live by the aromatics trade, in immense plains without water, and the Solate, whom I also defeated, imposing on them the task of guarding the sea-lanes.After I had vanquished and conquered, in battles wherein I personally took part, all these peoples so well protected by their impenetrable mountains, I restricted myself to imposing tribute on them and voluntarily returning their lands. But most peoples submitted of their own free will and paid me tribute.I sent an expedition by sea and land against the peoples living on the other side of the Erythraean Sea, that is the Arabitas and the Kinaidokolpitas, and after subjugating their kings I commanded them to pay me tribute and charged them with guaranteeing the security of communications on land and sea. I conducted war from Leuke Kome to the land of the Sabaeans.I am the first and only of the kings my predecessors to have subdued all these peoples by the grace given me by my mighty god Ares, who also engendered me. It is through him that I have submitted to my power all the peoples neighbouring my empire, in the east to the Land of Aromatics, to the west to the land of Ethiopia and the Sasou; some I fought myself, against others I sent my armies.When I had re-established peace in the world which is subject to me I came to Adulis to sacrifice for the safety of those who navigate on the sea, to Zeus, Ares and Poseidon. After uniting and reassembling my armies I set up here this throne and consecrated it to Ares, in the twenty-seventh year of my reign.

History
The inscription mentions military conquests in 3 different directions. First described are the North conquests and then boasts of a 'road constructed going from the lands of my empire to Egypt.' The only group of people mentioned that can be identified without difficulty are the Beja who are well known to have been in the north of the Ethiopian Highlands. The Atalmo and Tangaites are not known from any source apart from Monumentum Adulitanum.

Second described is a Western conquest. The western nation "Sesea/Sasu" could be a mistranslation of Kush if Cosmas mistook the letter kappa for a sigma which seems likely. "Ethiopia" refers to Nubia, which the Graeco-Roman world knew as "Ethiopia." The Aksumites appropriated the name "Ethiopians" for themselves during the reign of Ezana of Axum not long after. The inscription also notes that in the unnamed King's expedition to the mountains past the Nile, his men were knee-deep in snow. This has been postulated as the Simien Mountains. The Simiens are remarkable as being one of the few spots in tropical Africa where snow regularly falls. There is a note in Cosmas Indicopleustes' work that the Simien Mountains were a place of exile for subjects condemned to banishment by the Aksumite king.

Third and final, the inscription mentions an Eastern conquest. The subjugation of the Sabaeans, and the Kinaidokolpitai in modern-day Yemen (and perhaps Saudi Arabia).

The inscription ends with the King's affirmation that he is the first to have subjugated all of the aforementioned peoples, and dedicates his throne to Zeus (or the god Astar, cognate to the Semitic goddess Astarte). 'Beher' meant 'sea' in Ge'ez, and the name Beher mentioned in the monument refers to the Adulite version of the Greek god Neptune and especially Ares or Mahrem.

The 3rd century AD Adulite inscription also contains what may be the first reference to the Agaw, referring to a people called "Athagaus" (perhaps from ʿAd Agäw).

Seeing that the text was in Greek and followed an inscription about King Ptolemy III Euergetes's conquests in Asia, Cosmas Indicopleustes mistook the Aksumite inscription for the continuation of Ptolemy's. The Ptolemaic portion of the text is referred to as Monumentum Adulitanum II.

The identity of this king has been a point of contention for many years. The beginning of the inscription was damaged before being recorded by Cosmas. Munro-Hay claims the damaged inscription at the beginning might read, "Wāzānā, followed by an alternative (birth?) name ’Ella ‘Amīdā." If correct, the king is Ousanas.

See also
 Ethiopian historiography

References

Further reading

External links 
Aksum - Chapters 11-16 by Dr. Stuart Munro-Hay including full text of inscription
Online English translation of the Christian Topography

Aksumite Empire
Roman-era Greek inscriptions
Texts in Ge'ez
Multilingual texts
3rd-century inscriptions